The Girl with a Hatbox or Moscow That Laughs and Weeps is a 1927 Soviet silent romantic comedy film directed by Boris Barnet and starring Anna Sten, Vladimir Mikhailov and Vladimir Fogel. The picture was commissioned by the People's Commissariat (Narkomfin) to promote government bonds. It was a success with the audiences and the critics alike.

Plot
Natasha and her grandfather live in a cottage near Moscow, making hats for Madame Irène. Madame and her husband have told the housing committee that Natasha rents a room from them; this fiddle gives Madame's lazy husband a room for lounging. The local railroad clerk, Fogelev, loves Natasha but she takes a shine to Ilya, a clumsy student who sleeps in the train station. To help Ilya, Natasha marries him and takes him to Madame's to live in the room the house committee thinks is hers. Meanwhile, Madame's husband pays Natasha with a lottery ticket he thinks is a loser, and when it comes up big, just as Ilya and Natasha are falling in love, everything gets complicated...

Cast
Anna Sten as Natasha
Vladimir Mikhailov as her grandfather
Vladimir Fogel as Fogelev
Ivan Koval-Samborsky as Ilya Snegiryov
Serafima Birman as Madame Irène
Pavel Pol as Irène's Husband
Eva Milyutina as Marfusha

See also
The Three Million Trial
The House on Trubnaya

References

External links
 

1927 romantic comedy films
Russian romantic comedy films
Soviet black-and-white films
Russian silent feature films
Soviet romantic comedy films
Films directed by Boris Barnet
Soviet silent feature films
Russian black-and-white films
Silent romantic comedy films
1920s Russian-language films